Chili is a town in Monroe County, New York, United States. The population was 29,123 at the 2020 census.  It is a suburb of the city of Rochester.

The Town of Chili was established in 1822 from part of the Town of Riga. North Chili was a stop on the Underground Railroad. Black Creek Park is one of many parks in Chili where visitors can make use of nature trails that run along the creek.

History

The Chili area was once the hunting ground of the Seneca Indians. The first white settler was Captain Joseph Morgan who purchased land from Peter Sheffer of neighboring Wheatland.

The area of Chili became part of the newly formed Northampton. With the formation of Monroe County the area became part of the Town of Riga before splitting off into its own Town of Chili on February 22, 1822.

Chili was named after the country of Chile which was striving for independence at the time. Some suggest that the town was named after the Chiliasts religion embraced by some of the early settlers of South Chili. This is still controversial as there is no evidence to either side.

The local government includes Town Supervisor David Dunning (R) First Elected 2007; and Town Council Mark Decory (R); James Valerio (R); Michael S. Slattery (R); and Mary C. Sperr (R). The appointed Deputy Town Supervisor is Michael S. Slattery. The Chili Mills Conservation Area was listed on the National Register of Historic Places in 1975.

Geography

Demographics

As of the census of 2000, there were 27,638 people, 10,159 households, and 7,558 families residing in the town. The population density was 695.4 people per square mile (268.5/km2). There were 10,466 housing units at an average density of 263.3 per square mile (101.7/km2). The racial makeup of the town was 91.14% White, 5.71% African American, 0.24% Native American, 1.12% Asian, 0.02% Pacific Islander, 0.52% from other races, and 1.25% from two or more races. Hispanic or Latino of any race were 1.65% of the population.

There were 10,159 households, out of which 34.7% had children under the age of 18 living with them, 61.7% were married couples living together, 9.1% had a female householder with no husband present, and 25.6% were non-families. 20.2% of all households were made up of individuals, and 7.5% had someone living alone who was 65 years of age or older. The average household size was 2.67 and the average family size was 3.09.

In the town, the population was spread out, with 25.6% under the age of 18, 8.6% from 18 to 24, 29.4% from 25 to 44, 24.2% from 45 to 64, and 12.1% who were 65 years of age or older. The median age was 37 years. For every 100 females, there were 94.9 males. For every 100 females age 18 and over, there were 91.4 males.

The median income for a household in the town was $55,097, and the median income for a family was $61,481. Males had a median income of $45,156 versus $29,903 for females. The per capita income for the town was $23,887. About 2.0% of families and 3.6% of the population were below the poverty line, including 3.7% of those under age 18 and 2.5% of those age 65 or over.

Education

Chili is served by the Churchville-Chili Central School District, Gates Chili Central School District, and Wheatland–Chili Central School District.

Government

The town is governed by a town board consisting of a supervisor and four board members, all elected by registered town voters.

Communities and locations
Chili Center – The centre of town government and the most urbanized portion of the town.
Genesee River – Part of the east border of the town.
North Chili – A hamlet in the northwest part of the town and home to Roberts Wesleyan College.
South Chili – A rural area in Chili running along the New York State Thruway. The first business was located here called the Checker Tavern
West Chili – A small community located just north of Black Creek Park. Originally called Buckbee's Corners. 
East Chili - A small community in the eastern part of the town. This does not exist in present day.
Clifton- A small rural hamlet in the southern part of the town. Originally called Hardscrabble, it produced a world award winning type of flour.

Places of local interest

Public library
The Chili Public Library is the public library serving Chili, New York. It is currently located in the recently erected town government center at 3333 Chili Avenue. Previously, it occupied the old town government complex further east on Chili Avenue.

Roberts Wesleyan University
Roberts is a private, Christian, liberal arts college located in North Chili.  The school enrolls approximately 2,000 students. The school hosts various community events on its facilities, including soccer games, swimming lessons, dance recitals, fireworks, concerts, drama productions and many other events.

In 2022 Roberts was declared a university rather than a college.

American Legion 
Occupying the former Grange Hall, Chili American Legion Family Post 1830 at 450 Chili-Scottsville Rd., Scottsville, New York

Black Creek Park 
While Black Creek Park is still a relatively undeveloped park, its 1,505-acres has many unique features to offer. The park provides opportunities for hiking, soccer, fishing, horseback riding, sledding, and cross country skiing. It also features a playground located near the Pathfinder Shelter.  The park offers five hiking trails, all of which are excellent settings to view nature and animals. If you are going hiking, it is suggested that you print off a map. Each year emergency services are called for a lost or overdue hiker.

Hubbard Park 
Hubbard Park

Town of Chili Community Center 
Community Center

Chili Disk Golf Course 
Chili Disk Golf Course at Widener Park,  400 Chili Scottsville Road

Notable people 
 Homer G. Balcom, structural engineer of the Empire State Building, was born in Chili in 1870.

Sister cities
 Agropoli - Italy, Chili Indiana

References

External links
 Town of Chili
 Chili Public Library
 Chili Fire Department

Populated places on the Underground Railroad
New York (state) populated places on the Genesee River
Rochester metropolitan area, New York
Towns in Monroe County, New York
1822 establishments in New York (state)
Populated places established in 1822